The Trout Lake Tourist Club in Trout Lake, Washington, in Klickitat County was listed on the National Register of Historic Places in 2005.  It has also been known as Amusement Hall, Trout Lake Hall, Thode's Hall, and Historic Trout Lake Country Inn. 

It is a -story  by  building with a false front.

The building included a post office which closed in 1936.

References

Buildings and structures on the National Register of Historic Places in Washington (state)
Buildings and structures completed in 1904
Klickitat County, Washington
Western false front architecture